Khotta Bhasha is the language of the Khotta people, a small group of people who inhabit in the state of West Bengal. Khotta speakers are of entirely Muslim origin & reside in West Bengal.

There is a language in Jharkhand and in western borders of West Bengal, called Khortha (sometimes it is also called Khotta) is a well established language with its own literature. But Khotta Bhasha which is spoken in West Bengal is very much different from Khortha language and has no written form.

Geographic distribution 
The Khotta speaking people mainly inhabit in Kaliachak I & II, Harishandrapur, Ratua and Manikchak block in the district of Malda and Farakka, Samserganj, Raghunathganj and Suti I & II blocks in the district of Murshidabad of West Bengal state, India. They are also found scattered in parts of Birbhum, Medinipur & Hooghly district in West Bengal and in some places of Anwara upazila of Chittagong district in Bangladesh.

Present circumstances 
The total speakers of Khotta Bhasha is about 10 lakhs in the state of West Bengal. But they all are bilingual and speak and learn Bengali, as Khotta Bhasha has no written form. At present the language has only an intra community conversational status. Bengali is the only medium of education of Khotta People.

Comparison 

|+Comparison of Khotta Bhasha with standard Hindi and Standard Bengali
|-
! English
! Khotta Bhasha
! Hindi (Standard)
! Bengali (Standard)
|-
|We
|মেরে/হমসব 
Mere/Hamsab
|हम 
Ham
|আমরা 
Amra
|-
| Our
| মেঙ্কা/হমসবকা 
Menka/Hamsabka
| हमारा 
Hamara
| আমাদের 
Amader
|-
|You
|তুমকো 
Tumko
|तुम्हे 
Tumhe
|তোমাকে 
Tomake
|-
|Your
|তুমরা 
Tumra
|तुम्हारा 
Tumhara
|তোমার 
Tomar
|-
| Their
| উস্কিঙ্কা/উনসবকা 
Uskinka/Unsabka
| उनलोगो का 
Unlogo ka
| ওদের 
Oder
|-
| I am coming fast.
| ম্যায়/হম তুরুনি আমে হেঁ। 
May/Ham turuni ame he.
| में जल्दी आ रहा हूं। 
Mein jaldi a raha hun.
| আমি জলদি আসছি। 
Ami joldi aschi.
|-
| They will all come.
| উসকে/উনসব (সবকে) আবে গা।
Uske/Unsab (sabke) abe ga.
| वो सब आएंगे। 
Vo sab aenge.
| ওরা সবাই আসবে।
Ora sobai asbe.
|-
|You couldn't say 
anything!
|তুম কুচ্ছু কহে/কহনে সকো নি! 
Tum kucchu kahe/kahne Sako ni!
|तुम कुछ कह नहीं सके! 
Tum kuch kah nahi sake!
|তুমি কিছু বলতে পারলে না! 
Tumi kichu bolte parle na!
|-
| Who won in the game?
| খেলা মে কিস্কে জিতিস? 
Khela me kiske jitis?
| खेल में कोन जीता? 
Khel mein kon jeeta?
| খেলায় কারা জিতল? 
Khelay kara jitlo?
|-
| What are you doing?
| ত্যায় কা করে হে? 
Tay ka kare he?
| तू क्या कर रहे है? 
Tu kya kar rahe hai?
| তুই কী করছিস? 
Tui ki korchis?
|-
| Have you eaten rice?
| তুম কি ভাত খালিয়ো হো? 
Tum ki bhat khaliyo ho?
| क्या तुमने चावल खा लिया? 
Kya tumne chaval kha liya?
| তুমি কি ভাত খেয়ে নিয়েছ? 
Tumi ki bhat kheye niyecho?
|-
| Why will you not go?
| তুমরে/তুমসব কাহলে যাগো নি?
Tumre/Tumsab kahle jago ni?
| तुमलोग कियूं नहीं जाओगे? 
Tumlog kiyun nahin jaoge?
| তোমরা কেন যাবে না? 
Tomra keno jabe na?
|-
| We will not go to play 
now.
| মেরে/হমসব অভ্ভি খেলে/খেলনে যাঙে নি।
Mere/Hamsab abhbhi khele/khelne jange ni.
| हम अभी खेलने नहीं जाऊंगा। 
Ham abhi khelne nahin jaunga.
| আমরা এখন খেলতে যাব না। 
Amra ekhon khelte jabo na.
|-
| I will no longer eat litchis 
today.
| ম্যায়/হম আজ আর লেচু খাঙে নি।
May/Ham aj ar lecu khange ni.
| में आज और लीची नहीं खाऊंगा। 
Mein aj aur lici nahin khaunga.
| আমি আজ আর লিচু খাব না। 
Ami ar licu khabo na.
|-
| He has gone for a walk 
along the river.
| উ লদ্দিকা কাঁধিমে ঘুরে/ঘুরনে গিয়া হা। 
U laddika kandhime ghure/ghurne giya ha.
| वह नदी के किनारे घूमने गया है। 
Vah nadi ke kinare ghumne gaya hai.
| সে নদীর পাড়ে ঘুরতে গেছে। 
Se nodir pare ghurte geche.
|-
| I like to eat mangoes.
| মিঝকো/মিঝে/হমকো আম খায়মে/খানেমে 
খুব অচ্ছা লগেই। 

Mijhko/Mijhe/Hamko am khayme/khaneme 

khub accha lagei.
| मुझे आम खाना बहुत पसंद है। 
Mujhe am khana bahut pasand hai.
| আমার আম খেতে খুব ভালো লাগে।
Amar am khete khub bhalo lage.

References

Languages of West Bengal
Languages of Bangladesh